Sir Henry St George (1581–1644) was an English Officer of arms. He was the third (but eldest surviving) son of the herald Sir Richard St George and his wife Elizabeth St John.

Life 
He was born on 27 January 1581 at Hatley St George, Cambridgeshire. He entered the College of Arms as Rouge Rose pursuivant-extraordinary in 1610 and was promoted to Bluemantle Pursuivant the following year, in which capacity he accompanied his father in his visitations of Derbyshire and Cheshire. In 1614 he married Mary, the daughter of Sir Thomas Dayrell of Lillingstone Dayrell, Buckinghamshire, with whom he had eleven children. He was promoted to Richmond Herald in 1616 and acted as William Camden's deputy for a number of visitations between 1619 and 1623. In 1625 he was sent to France to bring Queen Henrietta Maria to England, and in 1627 he was sent to Sweden to invest King Gustavus Adolphus as a Knight of the Garter, on which occasion he was knighted by the Swedish king, and granted an augmentation of honour consisting of the Swedish royal arms on a canton in his personal arms.

Between 1633 and 1635 he acted as his father's deputy for the visitation of London, and in the reorganization of the College of Arms following his father's death, he was appointed Norroy King of Arms. In April 1639 he was suspended and fined by the Earl Marshal for forging his father's signature on a faked grant of arms, but he was restored with a pardon under the great seal a year later. During the English Civil War he accompanied King Charles to Oxford, where he was appointed Garter Principal King of Arms to succeed Sir John Borough in 1644. He died at Brasenose College, Oxford, on 5 November 1644 and was buried in Christ Church Cathedral.

His sons Thomas and Henry became Garters in 1686 and 1703 respectively. Another son Richard became Ulster King of Arms in 1660.

Arms

References

External links 
 NRA catalogue entry

1581 births
1644 deaths
People from South Cambridgeshire District
English heraldry
English officers of arms
17th-century English people
Garter Principal Kings of Arms